Dylan Dunlop-Barrett (born 17 March 1991 in Hāwera, Taranaki) is a New Zealand swimmer. He competed in the 4 × 200 metre freestyle relay event at the 2012 Summer Olympics. The New Zealand team completed the race on 31 July finishing 8th with a time of 7:17:18. Dylan had the 2nd fastest leg completing his 200 meters in 1:49.51. The other members of his team are Matthew Stanley, Steven Kent and Andy Macmillan.

Dunlop-Barrett won the Sportsperson of the Year overall award at the Taranaki Sports Awards in 2012. He announced his retirement from competitive swimming in 2015.

References

1991 births
Living people
New Zealand male freestyle swimmers
Olympic swimmers of New Zealand
Swimmers at the 2012 Summer Olympics
Sportspeople from Hāwera
Swimmers at the 2014 Commonwealth Games
Commonwealth Games competitors for New Zealand
21st-century New Zealand people